This article lists the emperors of Ethiopia, from the founding of the Zagwe dynasty in the 9th/10th century until 1974, when the last emperor from the Solomonic dynasty was deposed.

Kings of Aksum and Dʿmt are listed separately due to numerous gaps and large flexibility in chronology.

For legendary and archeologically unverified rulers of Ethiopian tradition, see List of legendary monarchs of Ethiopia.

Names in italics indicate rulers who were usurpers or not widely recognized.

Zagwe dynasty

Solomonic dynasty

Gondarine period

Era of the Princes

Modern Era

Tigrayan line

Shewan line

House of Savoy (Italian occupation)

Timeline from 1855

See also
Emperor of Ethiopia
Emperors of Ethiopia Family tree
President of Ethiopia
List of presidents of Ethiopia
Prime Minister of Ethiopia
List of heads of government of Ethiopia
List of royal consorts of Ethiopia
Zera Yacob Amha Selassie
Girma Yohannes Iyasu
Crown Council of Ethiopia
Ethiopian aristocratic and court titles
List of rulers of Shewa
History of Ethiopia
Ethiopian historiography

Notes

References

External links
Rasta Ites – List of Ethiopian Kings
Crown Council of Ethiopia

Emperors
 
Ethiopia
Ethiopia